John Haywood  (born 8 March 1956) is a British historian and author. A graduate of the universities of Lancaster, Cambridge and University of Copenhagen, Haywood has served as a lecturer at the University of Lancaster. He is the author of a number of books on the early history of Europe, and is considered an authority on Vikings and the Celts. Haywood is a Fellow of the Royal Historical Society.

Selected works
 The Penguin Historical Atlas of the Vikings, Penguin Books, 1995. 
 The Complete Atlas of World History, Sharpe Reference, 1997. 
 Ancient Civilizations of the Near East and Mediterranean, Cassell, 1997. 
 The Cassell Atlas of the Modern World : 1914-present (coécrit avec Edward Barratt & Brian Catchpole), Cassell, 1998. 
 World Atlas of the Past : The ancient world, Oxford University Press, 1999. 
 The Vikings, Sutton, 1999. 
 Historical Atlas of the Medieval World, AD 600-1492, Barnes & Noble, 2000. 
 Atlas of World History, Michael Friedman Publishing Group, Incorporated, 2000. 
 Historical Atlas of the Classical World, 500 BC - AD 600, Barnes & Noble Books, 2000. 
 Encyclopaedia of the Viking Age : With 279 Illustrations, Thames & Hudson, 2000. 
 Cassell's Atlas of World History, Cassell, 2001. 
 Atlas of the Celtic World, Thames & Hudson, 2001. 
 The Atlas of Past Times, Brown Reference, 2002. 
 Historical Atlas of the Early Modern World, 1492-1783, Barnes & Noble Books, 2002. 
 Everyday Life in the Ancient World, Anness Publishing, 2003. 
 Gods and Beliefs : Gods, Beliefs and Ceremonies Through the Ages, Anness Publishing, 2003. 
 Tribes and Empires, Anness Publishing, 2004. 
 The Complete Illustrated Guide to the Kings & Queens of Britain : A Magnificent and Authoritative History of the Royalty of Britain, the Rulers, Their Consorts and Families, and the Pretenders to the Throne (coécrit avec Charles Phillips), Anness Publishing, 2006. 
 Dark Age Naval Power : A Reassessment of Frankish and Anglo-Saxon Seafaring Activity, Anglo-Saxon Books, 2006. 
 Living History : What Life Was Like in Ancient Times, Anness Publishing, 2006. 
 The Great Migrations : From the Earliest Humans to the Age of Globalization, Gardners Books, 2008. 
 Medieval Europe, Capstone, 2008. 
 West African Kingdoms, Raintree, 2008. 
 The Historical Atlas of the Celtic World (coécrit avec Barry Cunliffe), Thames & Hudson, 2009. 
 The Ancient World, Penguin Group, 2010. 
 The New Atlas of World History : Global Events at a Glance, Princeton University Press, 2011. 
 Chronicles of the Ancient World, Quercus, 2012. 
 Viking : The Norse Warrior's [Unofficial] Manual, Thames & Hudson, 2013. 
 The Celts : Bronze Age to New Age, Routledge, 2014. 
 Northmen : The Viking Saga, AD 793-1241, Macmillan, 2016. 
 Ancient Romans, Brown Bear Books, 2017.

References

1956 births
Academics of Lancaster University
Alumni of Lancaster University
Alumni of the University of Cambridge
Celtic studies scholars
Fellows of the Royal Historical Society
University of Copenhagen alumni
Living people